This is a list of broadband providers in the United Kingdom. 

 BT Group: BT Group operates the BT Total Broadband brand and had 4.6 million accounts in January 2009. It also operates under the Plusnet brand. Plusnet was founded in 1997 and purchased by BT in 2007. 
EE: Operates home broadband under the EE brand, previously operated as Orange Broadband. EE are now wholly owned by BT Group.
The Phone Co-op is the only UK telecommunications provider which is owned and controlled by its customers, who also share in its profits. Launched in 1998, the business provides residential and business broadband as well as internet hosting and mobile telephony services.
Sky Broadband: a digital TV provider that also provides broadband and home phone services. Launched in 2006, it has its headquarters in London, UK. It offers bundle services with  TV, home phone and broadband services. It has operated the Be Unlimited brand since February 2013. In 2013 it acquired O2's home broadband business.
TalkTalk: TalkTalk offers broadband service to consumers in the UK. The ISP offers broadband and landline phone services, primarily through LLU.
Virgin Media: offers consumers a quadruple play bundle of TV, broadband, home phone and mobile.  The company also provides fibre optic (DOCSIS) broadband of up to 500Mbps.

See also 
List of mobile operators in the United Kingdom.
Broadband in Northern Ireland
Internet in the United Kingdom
List of United Kingdom ISPs by age
Telecommunications in the United Kingdom

References